Karinagam is a 1986 Indian Malayalam film, directed by K. S. Gopalakrishnan. The film stars Ratheesh, Anuradha, Balan K. Nair and Bheeman Raghu in the lead roles. The film has a musical score by A. T. Ummer.

Cast
Ratheesh
Anuradha
Balan K. Nair
Bheeman Raghu
Ranipadmini
T. G. Ravi
Raj Kumar
Jagathy sreekumar
Kuthiravattam Pappu

Soundtrack
The music was composed by A. T. Ummer and the lyrics were written by Poovachal Khader.

References

External links
 

1986 films
1980s Malayalam-language films